"Muwop" is a song by American rapper Latto (then known as Mulatto) featuring fellow American rapper Gucci Mane, released through Streamcut and RCA Records on July 30, 2020. Released as the second official single from Latto's debut album Queen of Da Souf, the single was serviced to American rhythmic contemporary radio on August 25, 2020. The song was produced by J. White Did It and heavily samples the 2007 single "Freaky Gurl" by Gucci Mane, taking its instrumental and chorus. The song's title combines Latto's stage name at the time of its release and one of the nicknames used by Gucci Mane, "Guwop". "Muwop" peaked at number four on the Billboard Bubbling Under Hot 100 chart.

Background and release 
In March 2020, it was officially announced that Latto had signed with RCA Records. Following the announcement, Latto released the promotional singles "No Hook" and "He Say She Say" in April and May respectively. In July 2020, Latto recreated some of Gucci Mane's album covers, starting with The State vs. Radric Davis. Gucci reacted positively. Latto announced the single days later. Latto later appeared on Genius's YouTube show Verified, where she explained the lyrics to the song.

Music video  
A music video was released coinciding with the song's release. It was shot in Miami and directed by Arrad. The video starts with a kid telling her mother that Latto has arrived, and her mother says that Gucci Mane cannot afford a girlfriend. Latto raps in a mansion, seated in front of a group of women receiving pedicures from shirtless men, before they head out to the pool, where Gucci Mane is. He and Latto head to the front of the mansion, as he raps his verse. The video ends with a tribute to Breonna Taylor.

Charts

Certifications

Release history

References 

2020 singles
2020 songs
Latto songs
Gucci Mane songs
Songs written by Gucci Mane
Songs written by J. White Did It
Song recordings produced by J. White Did It
RCA Records singles
Southern hip hop songs
Trap music songs
Songs written by Latto